Windsor railway station is located on the Ferny Grove line in Queensland, Australia. It serves the Brisbane suburb of Windsor.

Services
Windsor station is served by all stops Ferny Grove line services from Ferny Grove to Roma Street, Park Road, Coopers Plains and Beenleigh.

Services by platform

References

External links

Windsor station Queensland Rail
Windsor station Queensland's Railways on the Internet
[ Windsor station] TransLink travel information

Windsor, Queensland
Railway stations in Brisbane